Coquitlam is a city in the Lower Mainland of British Columbia, Canada. Mainly suburban, Coquitlam is the sixth-largest city in the province, with a population of 148,625 in 2021, and one of the 21 municipalities comprising Metro Vancouver. The mayor is Richard Stewart.

Simon Fraser explored the region in 1808, encountering the Indigenous Coast Salish peoples. Europeans started settling in the 1860s. Fraser Mills, a lumber mill on the north bank of the Fraser River was constructed in 1889, and by 1908 there were 20 houses, a store, post office, hospital, office block, barber shop, pool hall, and a Sikh temple.

History 
The Coast Salish people were the first to live in this area, and archaeology confirms continuous occupation of the territory for at least 9,000 years. The name Kwikwetlem is said to be derived from a Coast Salish term "kʷikʷəƛ̓əm" meaning "red fish up the river".

Explorer Simon Fraser came through the region in 1808, and in the 1860s Europeans gradually started settling the area. Coquitlam began as a "place-in-between" with the construction of North Road in the mid-19th century to provide Royal Engineers in New Westminster access to the year-round port facilities in Port Moody.

The young municipality got its first boost in 1889 when Frank Ross and James McLaren opened what would become Fraser Mills, a $350,000, then state-of-the-art lumber mill on the north bank of the Fraser River. The Corporation of the District of Coquitlam was incorporated in 1891. By 1908, a mill town of 20 houses, a store, post office, hospital, office block, barber shop, pool hall and a Sikh temple had grown around the mill. A mill manager's residence was built that would later become Place des Arts.

Over the next two years, several contingents of French Canadian mill workers arrived from Quebec, and Maillardville was born. Named for Father Edmond Maillard, a young Oblate from France, it became the largest Francophone centre west of Manitoba. Maillardville's past is recognized today in street names, the Francophone education system and French immersion programs, French-language Girl Guides and scouts, and celebrations such as Festival du Bois.

Following World War II, Coquitlam and the rest of the Lower Mainland experienced substantial population growth that continues today. The opening of Lougheed Highway in 1953 made the city more accessible and set the stage for residential growth. In 1971, Coquitlam and Fraser Mills were amalgamated, which gave the city a larger industrial base. The mill closed in 2001, and is now currently the subject of a proposed waterfront community.

Geography 
Coquitlam borders Burnaby and Port Moody to the west, New Westminster to the southwest, and Port Coquitlam to the southeast. Coquitlam's area, is about six times larger than either Port Moody or Port Coquitlam.

Coquitlam is in the Pacific Time Zone (winter UTC−8, summer UTC−7), and the Pacific Maritime Ecozone.

Neighbourhoods 

Coquitlam's geographic shape can be thought of as a tilted hourglass, with two larger parcels of land with a smaller central section connecting them.

Southwest Coquitlam comprises the original core of the city, with Maillardville and Fraser River industrial sector giving way to the large, elevated, flat-plateaued residential areas of Austin Heights. These older residences, with larger property dimensions, are increasingly being torn down and replaced with newer and larger homes. The Poirier Street area was the city's original recreational centre with the Coquitlam Sports Centre, Chimo Aquatic and Fitness Centre, and sports fields located there, while City Hall was previously located further south in Maillardville.

The Austin Heights area contains Como Lake, a renowned urban fishing and recreation area, and headwaters for the Como watershed. The watershed represents one of the last urban watersheds in the Tri-Cities that supports wild stocks of coho salmon as well as other species at risk such as coastal cutthroat trout (both sea-run and resident) and bird species such as the great blue heron and green heron. It also contains Mundy Park, one of the largest urban parks in the Metro Vancouver area.

In 1984, the provincial government sold  formerly attached to Riverview Hospital to Molnar Developments. Shortly afterward, this land was subdivided and became Riverview Heights, with about 250 single-family homes. The remaining  of this still-active mental health facility has been the subject of much controversy amongst developers, environmentalists, and conservationists. In 2005, the city's task force on the hospital lands rejected the idea of further housing on the lands and declared that the lands and buildings should be protected and remain as a mental health facility. In May 2021, the Government of British Columbia announced that the Riverview lands had been renamed səmiq̓wəʔelə (pronounced suh-MEE-kwuh-EL-uh), meaning "The Place of the Great Blue Heron". The kʷikʷəƛ̓əm Nation and BC Housing are working on a long-term master plan for development of the site.

Coquitlam Town Centre, was designated as a "Regional Town Centre" under the Metro Vancouver's Livable Region Strategic Plan. The concept of a town centre for the area dates back to 1975, and is intended to have a high concentration of high-density housing, offices, cultural, entertainment and education facilities to serve major growth areas of the region, served by rapid transit service. It is in the town centre that many public buildings can be found, including City Hall, a branch of the Coquitlam Public Library, an R.C.M.P. station, Coquitlam's main fire hall, the David Lam Campus of Douglas College, the Evergreen Cultural Centre, City Centre Aquatic Complex, Town Centre Park and Percy Perry Stadium.

In 1989, the provincial government sold  of second-growth forested land on the south slope of Eagle Mountain, known locally as Eagle Ridge, to developer Wesbild. This resulted in the closure of Westwood Motorsport Park in 1990, and the creation of Westwood Plateau, which was developed into 4,525 upscale homes, as well as two golf courses.

With development on Westwood Plateau completed and the opening of the David Avenue Connector in 2006, Coquitlam's primary urban development has now shifted to Burke Mountain in the northeastern portion of the city.

With new development of the Evergreen Extension of the Millennium Line of the SkyTrain rapid transit system which began operation in December 2016, Coquitlam's urban development area has again shifted to Burquitlam and secondly Burke Mountain. The Burke Mountain area plan is now divided into 4 new neighbourhood plans: Lower Hyde Creek Neighbourhood, Upper Hyde Creek Neighbourhood, Partington Creek, and Smiling Creek.

Climate 
Like much of Metro Vancouver, Coquitlam has an oceanic climate (Köppen climate type Cfb), experiencing mild temperatures and high precipitation; warm, dry summers and cool, wet winters. However, compared to most other cities in the area, precipitation is especially heavy in Coquitlam due to its proximity to the mountain slopes. With westward air moving off the Pacific Ocean, the air is forced to flow up the Coast Mountains causing it to cool and condense and fall as precipitation, this process is known as orographic precipitation. Although the mild temperatures allow for mostly rain to fall during the winter months, occasionally snow will fall.

This relatively mild climate, by Canadian standards, is caused by the warm Alaska Current offshore and the many mountain ranges preventing the cold arctic air from the rest of Canada from reaching the southwest corner of British Columbia.

Demographics 

According to the 2016 Census, 47% of households contained a married couple with children, 30% contained a married couple without children, and 22% were one-person households. Of the 40,085 reported families: 76% were married couples with an average of 3.0 persons per family, 15% were lone-parents with an average of 2.5 persons per family, and 9% were common-law couples with an average of 2.6 persons per family. The median age of Coquitlam's population was 41.1 years, slightly younger than the British Columbia median of 43.0 years. Coquitlam had 85.6% of its residents 15 years of age or older, less than the provincial average of 87.5%.

According to the 2016 census, about 44% of Coquitlam residents were foreign-born, much higher than the 28% foreign-born for the whole of British Columbia. The same census documented the median income in 2015 for all families was $65,020, compared to the provincial average of $61,280. 58.2% of respondents 15 years of age and older claim to have a post-secondary certificate, diploma or degree, compared to 55% province-wide. Lastly, also as of the 2016 census, only 23.4% of Coquitlam residents who work outside the home work within the city of Coquitlam itself, just less than half the provincial average of 48.9% of residents who work within their own municipality, yet 22.2% of Coquitlam residents take public transit, bicycle or walk to work, close to the provincial average of 22.4%.

Ethnicity

Languages 
The 2016 census found that English was spoken as the mother tongue of 50.47% of the population. The next most common mother tongue language was Mandarin, spoken by 9.66% of the population, followed by Cantonese at 6.43%. The south slope of Coquitlam, which includes Maillardville, has a pocket of French speakers.

Religion 
According to the 2021 census, religious groups in Coquitlam included:
 Irreligion (73,945 persons or 50.1%)
 Christianity (55,150 persons or 37.4%)
 Islam (9,315 persons or 6.3%)
 Buddhism (3,110 persons or 2.1%)
 Hinduism (1,955 persons or 1.3%)
 Sikhism (1,855 persons or 1.3%)
 Judaism (405 persons or 0.3%)
 Indigenous Spirituality (45 persons or <0.1%)

Economy 
As a bedroom community, the majority of Coquitlam residents commute to work in Vancouver, Burnaby, and other Metro Vancouver suburbs. Coquitlam's main industrial area lies in the southern Maillardville/Fraser Mills area near the Fraser River. Among the largest employers within Coquitlam are the City of Coquitlam with approximately 850 employees, Art in Motion with approximately 750 employees, and Hard Rock Casino with approximately 600 employees. Other major employers include Coca-Cola, Sony, and the Marine Propulsion division of Rolls-Royce.

In 2007, there were 610 retail businesses in Coquitlam, and these provided 8,765 jobs (27% of all jobs) within the city. Most retail businesses are concentrated around Coquitlam Centre in the Town Centre area, and big-box retailers such as IKEA and The Home Depot in the Pacific Reach areas, with the remainder of the city's retail outlets centered around the Austin Heights and North Road sectors.

The Tri-Cities Chamber of Commerce has over 900 members including businesses, professionals, residents and other community groups, governed by a 14-person volunteer Board of Directors.

Arts and culture
Being in close proximity to Vancouver and surrounded by the rest of the Lower Mainland, Coquitlam residents have access to virtually unlimited choice in cultural and leisure activities. Within the city itself are numerous venues that bring these choices closer to home.

Coquitlam was designated as a Cultural Capital of Canada in 2009 by the Department of Canadian Heritage.

Arts and entertainment 
The Molson Canadian Theatre, a 1,074-seat multi-purpose venue, opened as part of a $30 million expansion to Coquitlam's Hard Rock Casino in 2006, while Cineplex Entertainment operates the 4,475-seat SilverCity Coquitlam movie complex with 20 screens.

A partnership of the city, the arts community, private business and senior governments, the Evergreen Cultural Centre in the Town Centre area is a venue for arts and culture, a civic facility designed to host a wide variety of community events. It features a 264-seat black box theatre, rehearsal hall, art studios and art gallery. Evergreen serves as the home venue for the Pacific Symphonic Wind Ensemble, the Coastal Sound Music Academy, the Coquitlam Youth Orchestra, and the Stage 43 Theatrical Society. Nearby proscenium theatres include the 336-seat Terry Fox Theatre in Port Coquitlam, and the 206-seat Inlet Theatre in Port Moody.

Numerous yearly festivals are staged at various locations throughout Coquitlam, including Festival du Bois (first full weekend in March), the Water's Edge Festival (third full weekend in March), Como Lake Fishing Derby (last Sunday in May), BC Highland Games (last Saturday in June), a Canada Day Celebration at Town Centre Park, the BC Dumpling Festival (mid-August), and the Blue Mountain Music Festival (mid-July).

Attractions

Parks and community 

There are over 80 municipal parks and natural areas, with Mundy Park located roughly in the centre of the city being the biggest, and Ridge Park located in the highlands near the city's northern edge. Pinecone Burke Provincial Park, Minnekhada Regional Park, and Pitt Addington Marsh are on the northern and eastern border of the city, while the restricted area of the Metro Vancouver's Coquitlam watershed border Coquitlam to the north. Colony Farm is a 404-hectare park that straddles the Coquitlam and Port Coquitlam boundaries, offering walking trails rich with wildlife and gardens. Town Centre Park is a large city park located in the central area of the city, it provides city residents with many recreational activities. Como Lake Park and Glen Park are also popular with local residents.

Place des Arts is a non-profit teaching arts centre in Maillardville founded in 1972, offering programs in visual arts, music, acting, and dance. It features specialized programs for school students and home learners, and presents concerts and exhibitions for the public. Studios are offered for pottery, fibre arts, yoga, ballet, drama, piano, drawing and painting. Place des Arts offers four faculty concerts throughout the year, as well as numerous recitals and presentations by students on an ongoing basis.

Place Maillardville is a community centre providing leisure activities for all age groups, with programs on French language, culture, as well as physical activities. Heritage Square offers visitors a wealth of historic sites, gardens, a bike path, and an outdoor amphitheatre; it is also home to the Mackin Heritage Home & Toy Museum.

The city is responsible for the maintenance of numerous sports and recreation fields, including 40 grass/sand/soil sports fields, five FieldTurf fields, 35 ball diamonds, several all-weather surfaces, a bowling green, a croquet/bocce court, and a cricket pitch. The city also operates Percy Perry Stadium and the Poirier Sport & Leisure Complex. Privately owned Planet Ice features 4 additional ice rinks, and more rinks are found throughout the Tri-Cities.

Sports
Professional sports teams in the area include the Vancouver Canucks (National Hockey League), BC Lions (Canadian Football League), Vancouver Whitecaps FC (Major League Soccer), Vancouver Warriors (National Lacrosse League), and the Vancouver Canadians (Northwest League baseball). The 2010 Winter Olympics were also staged in the Metro Vancouver and Whistler areas.

There exists many opportunities for a wide variety of activities in Coquitlam:
 Baseball – The Coquitlam Reds of the B.C. Premier Baseball League play their home games at Mundy Park; the Reds' most famous alumnus is former Major League All-Star and National League MVP Larry Walker. Coquitlam is also home to Coquitlam Little League, which has been part of Little League International since 1955; Coquitlam finished 3rd at the 1984 Little League World Series. In 2008, Coquitlam hosted the Junior League Canadian Championships.
 Basketball – Coquitlam is home to the Tri-City Youth Basketball Association; formed in 1999, it serves the Tri-Cities with over 1,400 players from grades 2 to 9. The program is part of the Steve Nash Youth Basketball program administered by Basketball BC. It is open to both boys and girls, and operates out of school gyms across the Tri-Cities area.
 CrossFit – The regional CanWest CrossFit games have been held in the Percy Perry Stadium since 2016.
 Cricket – Coquitlam is home to the Windies Cricket Club. The club consists of over 40 members with 3 adult teams playing in the Premier, Second & Fifth Divisions. The club is affiliated with the British Columbia Mainland Cricket League and games are played at Mackin Park. A youth Kanga Cricket Program was formed with the aim of promoting and growing the game of cricket in Coquitlam. The SuperStrikers cricket team is open to boys and girls aged 6 – 16.
 Football – Coquitlam is home to the Coquitlam Minor Football Association, which is a member of the Vancouver Mainland Football League. CMFA players range from 6 to 18 years of age, and play against teams from the Lower Mainland and Vancouver Island. Coquitlam was also the home of the Tri-City Bulldogs of the Canadian Junior Football League from 1991 to 2004.
 Golf – In addition to courses in neighbouring communities in the Tri-Cities, Coquitlam itself is home to several golf facilities. The Vancouver Golf Club, located in southwest Coquitlam, has hosted four major LPGA tour events as well as one Senior PGA Tour event. The Westwood Plateau Golf & Country Club is one of the highest rated golf courses in Canada. Both the Westwood Plateau Golf Academy and Eaglequest Golf Centre are designed as executive learning courses.
 Hockey – Founded in 2001, the Coquitlam Express of the British Columbia Hockey League play at the Poirier Sport & Leisure Complex. Coquitlam is also home to the Coquitlam Minor Hockey Association, a AAA club in the Greater Vancouver area in the Pacific Coast Division, with almost 1000 members from Initiation Hockey 1 to Juvenile.
 Lacrosse – Coquitlam is home to the Coquitlam Adanacs of the Western Lacrosse Association, who play at the Poirier Sport & Leisure Complex, and to the Coquitlam Minor Lacrosse Association. In July 2008, Percy Perry Stadium hosted the 2008 ILF Under-19 World Lacrosse Championships.
 Motorsports – Coquitlam was formerly home to Westwood Motorsport Park, Canada's first purpose-built permanent road course, located on what is now Westwood Plateau. The first race was held in 1959, and over the years hosted many different professional series including Formula Atlantic and Trans-Am. Notable drivers to have raced at Westwood include Formula One World Champion Keke Rosberg, Indianapolis 500 winners Bobby Rahal and Danny Sullivan, Gilles Villeneuve and Michael Andretti, and Greg Moore. The track finally closed in 1990 due to encroaching development, and racing moved to Mission Raceway Park.
 Softball – Coquitlam is home to the Coquitlam Minor Softball Association. This association consists of about 300 registered players, predominantly females between the ages of 5 – 19 years of age. Most of the games are held at Mundy Park, Riverview Park, and Hillcrest Park. The CMSA is home to the Coquitlam Classics competitive rep program.
 Rugby – The city is home to the United Rugby Club which claimed the BC Rugby Under 23 championship in 2018. The club has two senior men's team and one senior women's team, as well, the team has age grade programs from its mini's program for elementary school children to U-16 and U-19 teams.
 Soccer – The city is home to two major soccer associations, including the Coquitlam Metro-Ford Soccer Club which has over 2500 players that range from Under-5 to adult teams including the Women's Premier team which plays in the Pacific Coast Soccer League, and the North Coquitlam United Soccer Club.
 Swimming – City Centre Aquatic Complex is an indoor aquatic centre built in the Town Centre area at a cost of $8.2 million and opened in 1994. It features a 50m Olympic size swimming pool, wave pool, waterslide,  fitness centre, and physiotherapy clinic. The Chimo Aquatic and Fitness Centre (CAFC) opened in 2008 in the Austin Heights area at a cost of $19.5 million, replacing the older Chimo Pool nearby. It features a 25m swimming pool, a 20m lap pool, leisure pool, and fitness room. Coquitlam also operates three outdoor swimming pools (Eagle Ridge, Rochester, Spani), two outdoor wading pools (Blue Mountain, Mackin), and three outdoor splash pads (Blue Mountain, Panorama, Town Centre).
 Track and field – Coquitlam is home to the Coquitlam Cheetahs track and field club, who train at Percy Perry Stadium, which was named after their former coach who died in 2005.

Government

Federal 
Coquitlam is represented by two federal MPs in the Parliament of Canada. Bonita Zarillo (NDP) represents the Port Moody—Coquitlam riding, while Ron McKinnon (Liberal Party) represents Coquitlam—Port Coquitlam.

Provincial 
Coquitlam is represented by three provincial MLAs in the Legislative Assembly of British Columbia. Rick Glumac (British Columbia NDP) represents the Port Moody-Coquitlam riding, while Joan Isaacs (BC Liberals) represents Coquitlam-Burke Mountain, and Selina Robinson (BC NDP) represents Coquitlam-Maillardville.

Municipal 
In the 2018 civic election, Richard Stewart was reelected as mayor of Coquitlam, and Craig Hodge, Chris Wilson, Teri Towner, Bonita Zarillo, Brent Asmundson, Dennis Marsden, Trish Mandewo and Steve Kim were all elected to Coquitlam City Council. Coquitlam contracts out garbage and recycling services to International Paper Industries for city residents, but local businesses are responsible for their own garbage and recycling arrangements. Coquitlam Lake provides residents with a mountain-fed water source, while the city maintains its own sewage management system.

Judicial 
The nearest Supreme Court of British Columbia venue is the New Westminster Law Courts. Provincial Court of British Columbia cases were formerly handled through the Coquitlam Provincial Court, but this was closed in 1996 and moved to the new Port Coquitlam Provincial Court.

Transportation 

Coquitlam is served by TransLink, which is responsible for both public transit and major roads.

With a project cost of $1.4 billion, the line runs from the Coquitlam City Centre area, through Coquitlam Central Station and into Port Moody, re-entering Coquitlam on North Road and finally joining the existing Millennium Line at Lougheed Town Centre.

There is regular bus service on numerous lines running throughout the city and connecting it to other municipalities in Metro Vancouver, with a major exchange at Coquitlam Central Station.

The West Coast Express, with a stop at Coquitlam Central Station, provides commuter rail service west to downtown Vancouver and east as far as Mission. WCE operates Monday to Friday only (excluding holidays), with five trains per day running to Vancouver in the morning peak hours and returning through Coquitlam in the evening peak hours.

For motorists, the Trans-Canada Highway provides freeway access to Burnaby, Vancouver, Surrey, and other municipalities in the Lower Mainland. Lougheed Highway is an alternative route to the Trans-Canada, entering Coquitlam through Maillardville, past the Riverview Hospital area, up to Coquitlam Centre where it turns sharply east to Port Coquitlam. Barnet Highway begins at the Coquitlam Centre area and heads directly east through Port Moody and on to Burnaby and downtown Vancouver.

Coquitlam has 60 km of bike routes, including dedicated bike lanes on Guildford Way, David Avenue, United Boulevard, Mariner Way, Chilko Drive and others, plus additional routes through city parks.

Coquitlam is served by two international airports. Vancouver International Airport, located on Sea Island in the city of Richmond to the west, is the second busiest in Canada and provides most of the air access to the region. Abbotsford International Airport, located to the east, is the seventeenth busiest airport in Canada. Nearby Pitt Meadows Airport provides services for smaller aircraft and there are also Boundary Bay Airport and Langley Airport for small aircraft.

Residents and visitors wishing to travel to Vancouver Island, the Gulf Islands, and other destinations along the Inside Passage may use the BC Ferries car and passenger ferry service from two terminals in the communities of Tsawwassen and Horseshoe Bay, south and north of Vancouver respectively. BC Ferries operates the Queen of Coquitlam, a C-class ferry capable of carrying 362 cars and 1,466 passengers, which was launched in 1976. She received an $18 million rehabilitation in November 2002, and currently operates as a secondary vessel on the Departure Bay-Horseshoe Bay route.

Infrastructure

Health care 

Coquitlam is served by Fraser Health, which operates the 106-bed Eagle Ridge Hospital on the Port Moody/Coquitlam city boundary. ERH opened its doors in 1984 and operates a 24-hour emergency department, ambulatory, long-term care and acute care programs. It is a Centre of Excellence for elective surgery for urology, gynaecology, plastics and orthopedics. The hospital also offers public education clinics for asthma, diabetes, rehabilitation services and programs for cardiology, children's grief recovery, youth crisis response and early psychosis prevention.

Fraser Health also operates the 352-bed Royal Columbian Hospital just south of Coquitlam in New Westminster. Coquitlam residents are also served by many privately owned health care clinics, while Tri-Cities Health Services operates 653 residential care beds.

Coquitlam is also the home of Riverview Hospital, a large mental health facility, operating under the governance of BC Mental Health & Addiction Services. Riverview opened in 1913 and had 4,630 patients at its peak, but advances in treatment and cutbacks in funding have resulted in fewer people receiving mental health care, and much of the facility has closed over the last few decades.

Police, fire, emergency services 

Coquitlam contracts out its police service to the Royal Canadian Mounted Police, with the main police station adjacent to City Hall at Coquitlam Town Centre and community police stations in the Austin Heights and Burquitlam areas. The Coquitlam RCMP detachment also serves the municipalities of Anmore, Belcarra, and Port Coquitlam.

Coquitlam has its own fire service, known as Coquitlam Fire/Rescue, with four fire halls. Coquitlam uses names, not numbers for their halls. The fire halls are Town Centre, Austin Heights, Mariner Way, near Mundy Park and Burke Mountain.

Like all other municipalities in British Columbia, Coquitlam's ambulance service is run by the British Columbia Ambulance Service.

Coquitlam Search and Rescue is a volunteer search and rescue team operating under the Provincial Emergency Program. Coquitlam SAR is responsible for urban and wilderness search and rescue for the area between Indian Arm and Pitt Lake, and encompasses the local communities of Coquitlam, Burnaby, Port Coquitlam, Port Moody, New Westminster, Belcarra and Anmore. The SAR team is based at Town Centre Fire Hall.

Community centres
The city manages four all-age community centres (Centennial, Pinetree, Poirier, Summit), and two senior community centres (Dogwood Pavilion, Glen Pine Pavilion).

Education 

Coquitlam is served by School District 43 Coquitlam, and offers four public secondary schools, seven middle schools, and dozens of elementary schools. Francophone education in the Tri-Cities is offered by Conseil Scolaire Francophone de la Colombie-Britannique.

Coquitlam Town Centre is home to the 4,000-student David Lam Campus of Douglas College, which offers university transfer, career-training and academic-upgrading programs. Therapeutic Recreation, Hotel and Restaurant Management, and Animal Health Technology programs are housed in the original main campus building. The $39 million Health Sciences Centre opened in 2008, with state-of-the-art facilities for Nursing, Psychiatric Nursing and other health-career programs.

There are two major universities, University of British Columbia and Simon Fraser University, located in the nearby municipalities. The British Columbia Institute of Technology (BCIT) in neighbouring Burnaby provides polytechnic education and grants degrees in several fields. Vancouver is also home to the Emily Carr University of Art and Design and the Vancouver Film School.

The Coquitlam Public Library has two branches: City Centre and Poirier. The library has a circulation of over 1.1 million items, and an annual budget of over $5 million.

Media 

In addition to the other Metro Vancouver media outlets, CKPM-FM was the first radio station dedicated to the Tri-Cities area when it took to the air in 2009.

Coquitlam is served by the bi-weekly Tri-City News newspaper.

A significant number of movie and television productions have been partly or completely filmed in Coquitlam in recent years, including a significant portion of 2018's Deadpool 2, 2014's Godzilla, both New Moon and Eclipse from the Twilight series, The X-Files, Juno, Smallville, Psych, The Sisterhood of the Traveling Pants, Dark Angel, The Day the Earth Stood Still, Romeo Must Die, Stargate SG1, Riverdale, and Watchmen. The city maintains the Coquitlam Film Office to coordinate permits, traffic and crowd control, and insurance for film and television productions.

Sister cities 
Coquitlam currently has sister city relationships with the following:
 Foshan, People's Republic of China
 Paju, South Korea

In November 2017, the city stated that they had ended sister city relationships with Laizhou, Tochigi, Ormoc and San Juan.

Notable people 
Juno Award-winning rock musician Matthew Good is from Coquitlam. He graduated from Centennial Secondary in 1989, and became lead singer for the Matthew Good Band, one of Canada's most successful alternative rock bands in the 1990s. Centennial Secondary was featured in the "Alert Status Red" video, and its cheerleading squad recorded for "Giant". The Matthew Good Band was dissolved in 2002, and Good has since pursued a solo career and established himself as a political activist, blogger, and author.

Actor Taylor Kitsch graduated from Gleneagle Secondary in 1999, and went on to star in movies such as John Carter and Battleship as well as the television series Friday Night Lights.

Former FA Premier League goalkeeper Craig Forrest is from Coquitlam and attended Centennial Secondary. Forrest appeared in 263 games for Ipswich Town, 30 games for West Ham United, and three games for Chelsea. Forrest also earned 56 caps for the Canadian national soccer team, the most of any goalkeeper in team history, and earned the most clean sheets in the country's history. Forrest was elected to Canada's Soccer Hall of Fame in 2007. Former Canadian national soccer team midfielder Jeff Clarke and Canadian women's national soccer player Brittany Timko also both attended Centennial Secondary.

Former National Basketball Association player Lars Hansen was raised in Coquitlam and played his high school basketball at Centennial Secondary. He was a member of the Seattle SuperSonics 1979 NBA Championship team, and was elected to the Canadian Basketball Hall of Fame in 2008.

Model and host of MTV Select and G4techTV Amanda MacKay also attended Centennial Secondary where she started her journalism career writing for the school's student newspaper.

American political analyst and former Fox News co-host Rachel Marsden was raised in Northeast Coquitlam's Burke Mountain area.

Former BC Lions placekicker Lui Passaglia has resided in Coquitlam for over 20 years. Passaglia is a member of the Canadian Football Hall of Fame, and his #5 jersey is one of eight numbers retired by the Lions. Passaglia was voted #30 of the CFL's Top 50 players of the modern era by Canadian sports network TSN.

Playboy Playmate and actress Dorothy Stratten was raised in Coquitlam and attended Centennial Secondary School. Stratten was Playmate of the Year for 1980. She appeared in several movies, including Peter Bogdanovich's They All Laughed, then she was murdered by her estranged husband. Stratten was portrayed twice in biographies of her life, by Jamie Lee Curtis in Death of a Centerfold: The Dorothy Stratten Story and by Mariel Hemingway in Star 80.

Actress and voice actress Lalainia Lindbjerg was born in Coquitlam and now resides in Vancouver. She's best known as the voice of Bulma in the Ocean dub of Dragon Ball Z.

Spoken word poet Chris Tse was raised in Coquitlam though he is based in Ottawa. He was captain of the Ottawa spoken word team that won the Canadian Festival of Spoken Word championships and placed second overall in the Poetry Slam World Cup in Paris, France.

Filipino pop and jazz singer, musician, lyricist, and songwriter Joey Albert is a Coquitlam resident.

Hockey players Mathew Barzal of the New York Islanders and Vincent Iorio of the Washington Capitals were born and raised in Coquitlam.

Science fiction novelist Dennis E. Taylor is a Coquitlam resident.

See also 

 Coat of arms of Coquitlam
 Tri-Cities
 Metro Vancouver
 Lower Mainland

Notes

References

External links 
 
 

 
Cities in British Columbia
Populated places in Greater Vancouver